The Harlem Renaissance, also known as the New Negro Movement, was a cultural, social, and artistic explosion centered in Harlem, New York, and spanning the 1920s. This ' List of notable figures from the Harlem Renaissance includes intellectuals and activists, writers, artists, and performers who were closely associated with the movement.

Intellectuals, activists, journalists

 Alain Locke
 Ferdinand Q. Morton
 Mary White Ovington
 Chandler Owen
 A. Philip Randolph

Writers

 Lewis Grandison Alexander
 Sterling A. Brown
 Joseph Seamon Cotter, Jr.
 Countee Cullen
 Alice Dunbar-Nelson
 Jessie Redmon Fauset
 Rudolph Fisher
 Edythe Mae Gordon
 Eugene Gordon (writer)
 Angelina Weld Grimke
 Robert Hayden
 Gladys May Casely Hayford
 Ariel Williams Holloway
 Langston Hughes
 Zora Neale Hurston
 Georgia Douglas Johnson
 Helene Johnson
 James Weldon Johnson
 Nella Larsen
 Claude McKay
 May Miller
 Effie Lee Newsome
 Richard Bruce Nugent
 Esther Popel
 George Schuyler
 Eulalie Spence
 Anne Spencer
 Wallace Thurman
 Jean Toomer
 Carl Van Vechten
 Eric Walrond

Performers and entertainers

 Josephine Baker
 Anise Boyer
 Charles Sidney Gilpin
 Adelaide Hall
 Nina Mae McKinney
 Mantan Moreland
 Krigwa Players
 Bill 'Bojangles' Robinson
 Nicholas Brothers
 Paul Robeson
 Tip, Tap and Toe
 The Four Step Brothers

Musicians and composers

 Marian Anderson
 Louis Armstrong
 Count Basie
 Gladys Bentley
 Eubie Blake
 Cab Calloway
 The Chocolate Dandies
 Dorothy Dandridge
 Duke Ellington
 Adelaide Hall
 Roland Hayes
 Fletcher Henderson
 Billie Holiday
 Lena Horne
 Hall Johnson
 James Price Johnson
 Moms Mabley
 Pigmeat Markham
 Florence Mills
 Jelly Roll Morton
 Ma Rainey
 Noble Sissle
 Bessie Smith
 Victoria Spivey
 William Grant Still
 Fats Waller
 Ethel Waters
 Chick Webb
 Bert Williams
 Fess Williams

Visual artists

 Charles Alston
 Henry Bannarn
 Richmond Barthé
 Romare Bearden
 Leslie Bolling, wood carvings
 Miguel Covarrubias, caricaturist
 Beauford Delaney
 Aaron Douglas
 Edwin A. Harleston
 Palmer Hayden
 Sargent Johnson
 William H. Johnson (painter)
 Lois Mailou Jones
 Jacob Lawrence
 Norman Lewis (artist)
 Archibald Motley
 Augusta Savage
 James Van Der Zee
 Meta Warrick Fuller
 Laura Wheeler Waring
 Hale Woodruff

References

Harlem Renaissance
1920s-related lists